The 1976 United States Senate elections was an election for the United States Senate. Held on November 2, the 33 seats of Class 1 were contested in regular elections. They coincided with Democrat Jimmy Carter's presidential election and the United States Bicentennial celebration. Although almost half of the seats decided in this election changed parties, Carter's narrow victory did not provide coattails for the Democratic Party.

This was the first election in which the Libertarian Party competed, running candidates in 9 of the 33 contested seats.  this is the first and so far only time both party leaders retired from the Senate in the same election cycle since the creation of the positions. This is the last time Democrats or any party won a 60% supermajority via direct elections (although Democrats briefly held one in the summer of 2009).

Results summary

Source:

Gains, losses, and holds

Retirements
Four Republicans and four Democrats retired instead of seeking re-election.

Defeats
Three Republicans, five Democrats, and one Conservative sought re-election but lost in the general election.

Change in composition

Before the elections

Elections results

Race summaries

Elections leading to the next Congress 
In these general elections, the winners were elected for the term beginning January 3, 1977; ordered by state.

All of the elections involved the Class 1 seats.

Closest races 
9 races had a margin of victory under 10%:

Nevada was the tipping point state with a margin of 31.6%.

Arizona 

Incumbent Republican Paul Fannin retired instead of seeking a third term. Democratic attorney and businessman Dennis DeConcini won the open seat over Sam Steiger, U.S. Congressman of Arizona's 3rd congressional district.

California 

Incumbent Democrat John Tunney ran for re-election to a second term, but was defeated by Republican Sam Hayakawa, President emeritus of San Francisco State University.

Connecticut 

Incumbent Republican Lowell Weicker won re-election to a second term over Gloria Schaffer, Connecticut Secretary of State

Delaware 

Incumbent Republican William Roth won reelection to a second term over Thomas Maloney, Mayor of Wilmington

Florida 

Incumbent Democrat Lawton Chiles won re-election to a second term over John Grady, Mayor of Belle Glade

Hawaii 

Incumbent Republican Hiram Fong retired instead of seeking re-election to a fourth term. Democrat Spark Matsunaga won the open seat over Republican William Quinn, Former Governor of Hawaii.

Indiana 

Incumbent Democrat Vance Hartke ran for re-election to a fourth term, but was defeated by Republican challenger Richard Lugar, Mayor of Indianapolis.

Maine 

Incumbent Democrat Edmund Muskie won re-election to a fourth term over Republican Robert A. G. Monks, shareholder activist.

Maryland 

Incumbent Republican Glenn Beall, Jr., ran for re-election to a second term, but was defeated by Democratic challenger Paul Sarbanes, member of the U.S. House of Representatives.

Massachusetts 

Incumbent Democrat Ted Kennedy won re-election to his fourth (his third full) term over Republican businessman, Michael Robertson.

Michigan 

Incumbent Democrat Philip Hart retired instead of seeking a fourth term. Democrat Donald Riegle, member of the U.S. House of Representatives, won the open seat over fellow congressman Republican Marvin Esch.

Minnesota 

Incumbent Democrat Hubert Humphrey won re-election to a fifth term over Republican Gerald Brekke, college professor

Mississippi 

Incumbent Democrat John C. Stennis won re-election to his sixth term.

Missouri 

Incumbent Democrat Stuart Symington retired, instead of seeking a fifth term. Republican John Danforth, Attorney General of Missouri, won the open seat, defeating Democrat Warren Hearnes, former Governor of Missouri. (Jerry Litton had won the Democratic nomination earlier, but was killed in a plane crash, and Hearnes was chosen by the party committee.)

Montana 

Rather than seek a fifth term, Democratic incumbent Mike Mansfield opted to retire, creating an open seat. United States Congressman John Melcher, who had represented Montana's 2nd congressional district from 1969 to 1977, won the Democratic nomination and defeated Stanley C. Burger, the Republican nominee and former executive officer of the Montana Farm Bureau Federation, by a wide margin in the general election.

Nebraska 

Incumbent Republican Roman Hruska retired instead of seeking another term. Democrat Edward Zorinsky, Mayor of Omaha, won the open seat over Republican John Y. McCollister, U.S. Congressman of Nebraska's 2nd congressional district.

Nevada 

Incumbent Democrat Howard Cannon won re-election to a fourth term over Republican David Towell, U.S. Representative from Nevada's At-large congressional district.

In the Senate, Cannon was known as a moderate in the Democratic Party. He served as chairman of several committees, including the rules committee and the inaugural arrangements committee. Cannon was nearly defeated for re-election in 1964 by Republican Lieutenant Governor Paul Laxalt in one of the closest election in history. However, he became more popular over the next few years and won re-election in 1970 with nearly 58% of the vote. In 1976, he faced U.S. Representative David Towell, who served just one term in the U.S. House of Representatives before running for the U.S. Senate. Cannon won re-election with 63% of the vote, one of his best election performances of his career. He won every county in the state, except for Eureka County, which Towell won with just 51% of the vote.

New Jersey 

Harrison A. Williams, the incumbent originally elected in 1958, elected to run for a fourth term. He defeated anti-abortion activist Stephen J. Foley handily in the Democratic primary with 85% of the vote. David A. Norcross won the Republican primary with the endorsement of the New Jersey Republican Party with 68% of the vote.

In the general election, Williams soundly won re-election to a fourth term over Norcross. He won 60% of the vote, winning every county in the state. This would be Williams' last election to the U.S. Senate, as he would resign in 1981 following his involvement in the Abscam scandal.

New Mexico 

Incumbent Democrat Joseph Montoya ran for re-election to a third term, but was defeated by Republican former Astronaut Harrison Schmitt.

New York 

Incumbent Conservative James Buckley ran for re-election to a second term as a Republican, but was defeated by Daniel Patrick Moynihan.

North Dakota 

Incumbent North Dakota Democratic NPL Party Democrat Quentin Burdick, sought and received re-election to his fourth term to the United States Senate, defeating Republican candidate Robert Stroup. Only Burdick filed as a Dem-NPLer, and the endorsed Republican candidate was Robert Stroup, as state senator from Hazen, North Dakota. Burdick and Stroup won the primary elections for their respective parties. One independent candidate, Clarence Haggard, also filed before the deadline under the American Party.

Ohio 

Incumbent Republican  Robert Taft Jr. ran for re-election to second term, but was defeated by Democratic former senator Howard Metzenbaum.

Pennsylvania 

Incumbent Republican and Minority Leader Hugh Scott retired. Republican John Heinz won the open seat over Democrat Bill Green, United States Representative

In December 1975, U.S. senator Hugh Scott announced that he would not seek re-election in 1976 at the age of 75 after serving in Congress for 33 years. Scott listed personal reasons and several "well-qualified potential candidates" for the seat among the reasons of his decision to retire. Other reasons, including his support for Richard Nixon and accusations that he had illegally obtained contributions from Gulf Oil were alleged to have contributed to the decision.

Heinz was the victor in all but nine counties, defeating opponent William Green, who had a 300,000 vote advantage in his native Philadelphia area. Heinz and Green spend $2.5 million and $900,000, respectively, during the ten-month campaign. Much of the money Heinz spent on his campaign was his own, leading to accusations from Green that he was "buying the seat". Heinz replied to this by claiming that the spending was necessary to overcome the Democratic voter registration advantage.

Rhode Island 

Incumbent Democrat John O. Pastore did not seek re-election. Republican John Chafee won the seat, defeating Democrat Richard P. Lorber.

Tennessee 

Incumbent Republican Bill Brock ran for re-election to a second term, but was defeated by Democratic challenger James Sasser.

Texas 

Incumbent Democrat Lloyd Bentsen won re-election to a second term over Republican Alan Steelman, U.S. Representative from Texas's 5th district.

Utah 

Incumbent Democrat Frank Moss ran for re-election to a fourth term but was defeated by his Republican opponent Orrin Hatch.

Vermont 

Incumbent Republican Robert Stafford successfully ran for re-election to another term in the United States Senate, defeating Democratic candidate Governor Thomas P. Salmon.

Virginia 

Incumbent Independent Harry F. Byrd Jr. was re-elected to a second term over retired Admiral Elmo Zumwalt and state legislator Martin H. Perper.

Washington

West Virginia 

For most of the state's history, West Virginia has been a solidly Democratic state. Often, winning the Democratic primary was tantamount to winning the general election in the state. Despite West Virginia occasionally electing a Republican governor (Arch A. Moore Jr. and Cecil H. Underwood both served as governor) and voting for Dwight D. Eisenhower twice in presidential elections, West Virginia has only elected Democratic Senators since 1956. Byrd had faced Republican opposition every term since he defeated Chapman Revercomb in 1960, but the Republicans chose not to mount a nominee in 1976. Freshman Congressman Cleve Benedict would serve as the Republican nominee in 1982.

Wisconsin 

Originally elected in 1957 to fill the seat of Joseph McCarthy, William Proxmire had won re-election three times prior to 1976. He only faced significant Republican opposition twice during his re-election years, winning 70% of the vote and every county in 1970. Clergyman Stanley York was the Republican nominee. Proxmire ultimately defeated York and increased his margin of victory by 4%. Proxmire would serve two more terms, ultimately retiring in 1989.

Wyoming 

Gale W. McGee, the incumbent senator and former professor at the University of Wyoming, was originally elected in 1958 over Frank A. Barrett. He subsequently won two more elections to the senate over John S. Wold. McGee, who managed to become re-elected several times in a heavily Republican-leaning state, faced headwinds from Gerald Ford's popularity in the state. State senator Malcolm Wallop was the Republican nominee. 

In the general election, Wallop comfortably defeated McGee, who won just four counties in the state. As of 2023, McGee is the last Democratic senator from the state of Wyoming.

See also
 1976 United States elections
 1976 United States gubernatorial elections
 1976 United States presidential election
 1976 United States House of Representatives elections
 94th United States Congress
 95th United States Congress

Notes

References

Sources